The John Ross Farm is a historic farm located in Leroy, Indiana. It is listed on the National Register of Historic Places (96000283).

The listing included five contributing buildings on : a farmhouse, a hog house, a chicken house, a well house, and a garage.

See also
 National Register of Historic Places listings in Lake County, Indiana

References

External links
 John Ross Farm, Landmark Hunter

Farms on the National Register of Historic Places in Indiana
Buildings and structures in Lake County, Indiana
National Register of Historic Places in Lake County, Indiana
Buildings and structures completed in 1871